The Cebu Schools Athletic Foundation, Inc. (CESAFI) is a sports and academic association of 14 schools, colleges and universities in Cebu, Philippines. The CESAFI was established in 2001.

History
Before the creation of the CESAFI, there was already a collegiate league in Cebu, named the Cebu Amateur Athletic Association (CAAA), also formerly known as Cebu Collegiate Athletic Association (CCAA). The league was created sometime in the 1930s and was the country's second college sports league, only preceded by the National Collegiate Athletic Association (NCAA) which was created in 1924, and way before the creation of the University Athletic Association of the Philippines (UAAP) in 1938. CAAA was regarded as clearly the best college sports league outside Metro Manila and one of the three major college leagues together with the UAAP and the NCAA, both of which are based in Manila. The CAAA has had a rich history from the 1930s until it dissolved in 2000, producing top Filipino basketball players such as Ramon Fernandez of USC, regarded as the greatest Filipino basketball player during the golden years of the Philippine Basketball Association (PBA) in the 1970s and 1980s, alongside two-time PBA MVP Abet Guidaben, Jojo Lastimosa, Zaldy Realubit, Bernie Fabiosa, and Dondon Ampalayo of University of San Jose–Recoletos (USJ-R). Other collegiate greats who became PBA legends include PBA star Dondon Hontiveros and Biboy Ravanes of the University of Cebu (UC), and Boy Cabahug, Al Solis and superstar Manny Paner of the University of the Visayas (UV).

CAAA took an unexpected turn going into the new millennium. In 1999, league commissioner Felix Tiukinhoy, Jr. barred a player of Salazar Institute of Technology (now Salazar Colleges of Science and Institute of Technology) on the basis of the said player's eligibility. The following year, 2000, saw another controversy in the high school basketball division. The University of San Carlos, Salazar Institute of Technology, and Don Bosco Technology Center were all tied at second place, with identical 3–2 win loss records, with the second-placed team set to face the University of the Visayas in the finals of the high school basketball division. However, confusions surrounding the quotient system to break the tie between the three teams cost Salazar the second place and, subsequently, a spot in the finals. These events caused the school to file a case against Tiukinhoy and the CAAA. However, a couple of months after the ordeal, the CAAA ceased to exist, and in place came in a new league, named as the Cebu Schools Athletic Foundation, Inc. or CESAFI. The CESAFI was basically the same league but with a different name with the same teams except for Salazar, which was denied entry for the new league. The Southwestern University, who were the champions of the last season of the CAAA in 2000, despite being included in the CESAFI, decided against fielding a team in the new league. However, on 2007, SWU eventually returned to compete in the CESAFI.

In the league's first 9 years, the University of the Visayas was considered to be the league's powerhouse, winning the basketball tournament for 9 consecutive years and was a contender for basically all the sports of the league. However, this changed in the league's 10th season, after the University of Cebu, led by June Mar Fajardo, became the first team other than UV to win the basketball championship. In addition, the University of San Jose–Recoletos won the men's and women's volleyball championship, the University of Southern Philippines Foundation won the athletics championship. The University of Cebu also won the tennis tournament, a sport which UV has also dominated for a long time.

In 2013, a high school basketball player named Scott Aying, son of former PBA player Danny Aying, was ruled ineligible after failing to serve a two-year residency period after transferring from San Beda College to the University of San Carlos. Aying's parents sought legal action against CESAFI and the league's commissioner, Felix Tiukinhoy, Jr. Aying's parents argued that Tiukinhoy and other league officials “wrongfully interpreted the tournament’s rules and "unjustly disqualified" our son". The judge later allowed the younger Aying to play, stating that Aying did not violate the league's two-year residency rule.

In 2015, Southwestern University was found to have fielded overaged basketball players in their high school team after it was discovered that nine of its players have submitted the tampered versions of their birth certificates. To avoid inflicting more damage to the school's name, SWU eventually pulled out all of its teams in the high school division and also considered to pull out all of its college teams but decided not to as the school is considered a perennial contender in the college division especially in the basketball championship. The university had also issued an apology to the CESAFI about this incident. However, SWU eventually returned to the high school division the following year.

In 2018, University of Cebu – Lapu-Lapu and Mandaue Campus became the thirteenth member school to join the CESAFI tournament.

The CESAFI was one of the many sports leagues affected by the COVID-19 pandemic in the Philippines. The pandemic forced the league to cancel its 2020 and 2021 seasons.

In 2022, the University of the Philippines Cebu confirmed its participation in the CESAFI, becoming its 14th member school.

Member schools

College division
There are a total of thirteen member schools in the college division.

High school division
There are thirteen member schools in the high school division. All ten schools in the college division have a team in the high school division. Sacred Heart School – Ateneo de Cebu, as a K-12 school, is the only member without an affiliated team in the college division, while Velez College does not have a high school division affiliate.

Guest members

Events
The CESAFI sets itself apart from other Philippine inter-school leagues as aside from its sporting events, it also holds academic and cultural events, which are contested and participated by all of its member schools. As of 2018, CESAFI has 15 sporting events, and 14 academic and cultural events.

Sports
The league, as of 2018, has ten schools competing in 15 different sports:

 Athletics
 Badminton
 Basketball
 Beach volleyball
 Chess
 Dancesport
 Football
 Futsal
 Karatedo
 Lawn tennis
 Swimming
 Table tennis
 Taekwondo
 Volleyball
 Weightlifting

The league also plans to add golf, weightlifting and bowling in the far future. Unlike the University Athletic Association of the Philippines and the National Collegiate Athletic Association, CESAFI teams do not compete for an overall championship.

Academic and cultural events
As of the 2018 season, CESAFI has twelve schools competing in 14 academic and cultural events. These events consist of the following:
 Balak/Sangka sa pulong (Poem recitation)
 Current events & general information quiz
 Declamation
 Essay writing
 Hip-hop dancing
 Impromptu speaking
 Math quiz bee
 Oration
 Robotics
 Science quiz bee
 Sudoku
 Spelling bee
 Vocal duet
 Vocal solo

CESAFI Basketball Championship

CESAFI's basketball tournament is arguably its most popular event, and is considered one of the country's top collegiate basketball tournaments, along with the UAAP and NCAA's basketball tournaments. Below is the list of champions of the CESAFI Basketball Tournament.

List of CESAFI basketball champions

Most Valuable Players

Season

Notes

Number of championships by school

Media coverage
Since its inception in 2001, replacing the old Cebu Amateur Athletic Association, CESAFI has received extensive coverage from the Cebu media and local and national newspapers like Sun.Star and The Philippine Star, but still lags behind in terms of its Manila-based counterparts UAAP and the NCAA in terms of publicity. Also, unlike the UAAP and NCAA, CESAFI had no national television partners. However, this changed as on its 15th season, the CESAFI went into nationwide TV coverage after signing an agreement with IBC 13 and Viva Sports. This agreement allowed the basketball, football and volleyball games to be televised on the channel. For its 16th season, CESAFI and Viva Sports partnered with AksyonTV to broadcast the basketball games, which is aired every Monday to Friday from 6 to 8 p.m. For its 19th season, the CESAFI is working with different student volunteers from the various member schools for the production coverage of the basketball games. The endeavour is called "CESAFI Live" and was hatched by long-time commissioner, Felix Tiukinhoy, Jr., who expressed his desire to create an environment where students are not just mere spectators. “We take CESAFI one step further this Season 19, not only by improving the environment for our student-athletes and other event contenders, but also by including more students not merely as spectators and fans, but as actual organizers and managers of various committees that make CESAFI a success,” said Tiukinhoy. All season long, the students would handling different elements of the production coverage such as camera handling, courtside reporting and annotating.

See also
 University Athletic Association of the Philippines
 National Collegiate Athletic Association (Philippines)
 United Central Luzon Athletic Association
 Philippine Collegiate Champions League

External links
 Official website

References

2001 establishments in the Philippines
Student sport in the Philippines
Sports in Cebu